The West Maple Omaha Rock (nicknamed Rocko, also referred to as the west Omaha rock and similar names) is a boulder located in a parking lot at the corner of West Maple Road and North 156th Street in north-western Omaha, Nebraska, in the United States. It became the subject of significant online discourse as well as a local tourist attraction in late 2019 after over a dozen vehicle owners drove on top of it. This included at least six that had to be towed within six weeks. The rock was originally placed on a curb to prevent people from driving over it; however, it was sloped such that it was often not visible to taller automobiles and would get stuck between their wheels. A Facebook group dedicated to the rock, "The W Maple Omaha Rock", was created by employees of a nearby UPS Store and had over 25,000 followers in November 2019; a subreddit and Google Maps listing were also created.

In January 2021, the rock was repositioned such that it was no longer sloped towards the road and a tree was planted near it to catch drivers' attention.

References

External links 
 The W Maple Omaha Rock Facebook group
 Google Street View of the rock in June 2021

Omaha, Nebraska
Individual rocks